The Bengal Sultanate–Kingdom of Mrauk U War of 1512–1516 was a conflict in the 16th century between the Bengal Sultanate and the Kingdom of Mrauk U.

Background
After the Reconquest of Arakan, the Kingdom of Mrauk U was established as a Bengali protectorate. By the 16th century, Mrauk U challenged Bengali hegemony and declared independence several times. Southeastern Bengal, including the port of Chittagong, often fell under Arakanese rule.

Conflict
Alauddin Husain Shah, the Sultan of Bengal, invaded the region in the 1510s. The war persisted for four years until 1516, when Mrauk U recognized Bengali sovereignty over Chittagong and northern Arakan. As a result of the conflict, Mrauk U again became a vassal of the Bengal Sultanate.

References 

Conflicts in 1512
Conflicts in 1513
Conflicts in 1514
Conflicts in 1515
Conflicts in 1516
1512 in Asia
1513 in Asia
1514 in Asia
1515 in Asia
1516 in Asia
Military history of the Bengal Sultanate
Military history of Myanmar